Stachyris is a genus of passerine birds in the Old World babbler family Timaliidae.

Taxonomy
The genus Stachyris was introduced in 1844 in an article by the English zoologist Edward Blyth in which he quotes a diagnosis by Brian Houghton Hodgson. Hodgson designated the type species as the grey-throated babbler. The genus name combines the Ancient Greek stakhus meaning "ear of wheat" and rhis, rhinos meaning "nostrils".

Species 
The genus includes the following species:

For other former Stachyris species see under Cyanoderma, Sterrhoptilus and Zosterornis.

References

Collar, N. J. & Robson, C. 2007. Family Timaliidae (Babblers)  pp. 70 – 291 in; del Hoyo, J., Elliott, A. & Christie, D.A. eds. Handbook of the Birds of the World, Vol. 12. Picathartes to Tits and Chickadees. Lynx Edicions, Barcelona.

 
Taxonomy articles created by Polbot